Harshaville, Ohio (also known as Harshasville) is an unincorporated community in Adams County, Ohio, USA, in the southern part of the state.

Harshaville was built up around the early Harsha Mill, a gristmill powered by the Cherry Fork Creek. The community was named for the local Harsha family. A post office was established at Harshaville in 1865, and remained in operation until 1909.

It is the location of Harshaville Covered Bridge, a historic bridge that is listed on the National Register of Historic Places.

Gallery

References

Unincorporated communities in Adams County, Ohio
Unincorporated communities in Ohio
1865 establishments in Ohio